Department of Highways or variations, may refer to:

Government agencies

In the United States
Department of Highways, a precursor agency of the Alaska Department of Transportation & Public Facilities
Department of Highways, a precursor agency of the California Department of Transportation
Department of Highways, a precursor agency of the Colorado Department of Transportation
Department of Highways, a precursor agency of the Idaho Transportation Department
Department of Highways, a precursor agency of the Indiana Department of Transportation
Department of Highways, a government agency under the Kentucky Transportation Cabinet
Department of Highways, a precursor agency of the Minnesota Department of Transportation
Department of Highways, a precursor agency of the Montana Department of Transportation
Department of Highways, a precursor agency of the Nevada Department of Transportation
Department of Highways, a precursor agency of the New York State Department of Transportation
Department of Highways, a precursor agency of the Ohio Department of Transportation
Department of Highways, a precursor agency of the Oklahoma Department of Transportation
Department of Highways, a precursor agency of the Pennsylvania Department of Transportation
Department of Highways, a precursor agency of the Vermont Agency of Transportation
Department of Highways, a precursor agency of the Virginia Department of Transportation
Department of Highways, a precursor agency of the Washington State Department of Transportation
Department of Highways, a precursor agency of the West Virginia Department of Transportation

In Canada
Department of Highways, a precursor agency of the Ministry of Transportation of Ontario
Department of Highways, a precursor agency of the Ministry of Highways and Infrastructure (Saskatchewan)

In other places
Department of Highways, a government agency under the Ministry of Transport (Thailand)

Other uses
Department of Highways Futsal Club, a futsal club in Thailand

See also
Department of Highways and Minor Ports (Tamil Nadu), a department of the government of Tamil Nadu, India
Department of Highways, Ports and Properties, a precursor agency of the Department of Infrastructure of the Isle of Man
Ministry of Highways, Ports & Shipping, a former Sri Lankan government ministry